Calcipotriol/betamethasone dipropionate, sold under the brand name Taclonex among others, is a fixed-dose combination medication of the synthetic vitamin D3 analog calcipotriol (also known as calcipotriene) and the synthetic corticosteroid betamethasone dipropionate for the treatment of plaque psoriasis. It is used in the form of ointment, topical suspension, gel, aerosol, and foam.

Medical uses 

Calcipotriol/betamethasone dipropionate (Cal/BD) is a topical medication for the treatment of trunk, limb, and scalp plaque psoriasis. This medication  is available in ointment, gel, aerosol, or foam, formulations. The ointment formulation was FDA approved in 2004, and is indicated for the once daily topical treatment of plaque-type psoriasis vulgaris amenable to topical therapy. The foam formulation was approved by the FDA in 2015, and is indicated for the topical treatment of plaque psoriasis in patients twelve years of age and older.

In all pivotal trials of calcipotriol/betamethasone dipropionate ointment, topical suspension, or foam, treatment success or achievement of 'clear' or 'almost clear' disease was defined by Investigator's Global Assessment, an alternative to the Psoriasis Area and Severity Index (PASI) score.

Ointment

In an international, double-blind, parallel group study of 1603 participants with psoriasis (affecting at least 10% of one or more body regions), more patients on once-daily calcipotriol/betamethasone dipropionate ointment had controlled disease, defined as having absence or very mild disease at 4 weeks (56.3%) compared with Cal 50 μg/g (22.3%). In addition, a retrospective analysis of data from six phase 3, double-blind studies found that more patients treated with calcipotriol/betamethasone dipropionate ointment achieved PASI 75 than patients treated with individual components, regardless of baseline disease severity.

Foam

The foam formulation has been studied in two pivotal, randomized, double-blind trials in patients with mild to severe plaque psoriasis. In the first study (randomized, phase 2) of 302 patients with body and scalp psoriasis, more patients treated with calcipotriol/betamethasone dipropionate (Cal/BD) foam achieved 'clear' or ' almost clear' disease (45%) according to the IGA by 4 weeks compared with Cal 50 mcg/g or BD 0.5 mg/g (15% and 31%, respectively). In a second study (randomized, phase 3) of patients with psoriasis on the body (N=426), a significantly greater proportion of patients treated with once-daily Cal/BD foam achieved 'clear' or 'almost clear' disease (53.3%) vs. those receiving the vehicle control (4.8%). Mean modified PASI score was also significantly lower for patients treated with Cal/BD foam compared with vehicle (2.0 vs 5.5, respectively, at week 4), and itch relief was significantly greater in patients using the Cal/BD foam beginning at day 3. A recent study compared the Cal/BD foam formulation with the ointment formulation in patients with mild to severe psoriasis. At 4 weeks, significantly more patients achieved treatment success, defined as 'clear' or 'almost clear' disease according to the IGA with Cal/BD foam (54.6%) versus the ointment (43.0%). However, pronounced itch relief occurred quickly and was maintained throughout the 4-week study duration with both formulations.

Contraindications 

Calcipotriol/betamethasone dipropionate is contraindicated in patients with hypersensitivity to either glucocorticoids or vitamin D or disorders in calcium metabolism.  This drug is also contraindicated for patients with erythrodermic, exfoliative, or pustular psoriasis.

Adverse effects 

A number of clinical studies have been conducted to investigate possible adverse events of this fixed combination corticosteroid and vitamin D analog.  Safety and tolerability of calcipotriol/betamethasone dipropionate (Cal/BD) ointment has been assessed in a combined total of 2448 patients, exposed to treatment for 4 or 8 weeks (median weekly dose of 24.5 g). The most common adverse events for patients receiving Cal/BD were pruritus (3.1%), headache (2.8%), and nasopharyngitis (2.3%). Lesional/perilesional adverse events, defined as an adverse event located ≤2 cm from the lesional border, were reported by 8.7% of patients treated with Cal/BD ointment. Median time to onset of lesional/perilesional adverse events was 7 days.

Adverse events during treatment with the foam formulation have been evaluated in three 4-week randomized, multicenter, prospective vehicle- and/or active-controlled clinical trials of subjects with plaque psoriasis. The median weekly dose was 24.8 g. Application site irritation, application site pruritus (itching), folliculitis (inflammation of hair follicles), skin hypopigmentation (loss of skin color), hypercalcemia (increased blood calcium levels), urticaria, and exacerbation of psoriasis were reported in <1% of subjects. Local long-term adverse effects of continuous steroid exposure may include skin atrophy, stretch marks, telangiectasia (spider veins), dryness, local infections, and miliaria ("prickly heat").

Pharmacology

Pharmacodynamics 
A number of clinical studies have been conducted to research possible adverse effects of this drug combination, which can be expected from experiences with corticosteroids and vitamin D analogs.

Hypothalamic-pituitary-adrenal axis suppression

In a small study of calcipotriol/betamethasone dipropionate (Cal/BD) ointment once-daily for 4 weeks, no patients (N=11 tested) demonstrated adrenal suppression defined as 30-minute post-stimulation cortisol level ≤18 mcg/dL. In two other studies of Cal/BD ointment, 1 patient of 19 (5.3%) had adrenal suppression, as did 5 patients of 32 (15.6%) after 4 weeks of treatment. In the latter study, it may be noted that patients used Cal/BD ointment on the body in addition to Cal/BD topical suspension on the scalp.

Potential effects on hypothalamic-pituitary-adrenal (HPA axis) function of the foam formulation were evaluated in a clinical trial of adults (N=35) with moderate to severe plaque psoriasis covering a mean of 18% of the body surface area of the trunk and limbs and 50% of the scalp. The foam was applied once daily to all lesions on the trunk, limbs and scalp for 4 weeks. Mean (range) weekly exposure was 62 (13.5–113) g. After 4 weeks, no patient exhibited adrenal suppression, defined as a cortisol level ≤497 nmol/L 30 minutes after adrenocorticotropic hormone challenge. Lack of adrenal suppression over the course of four weeks does not preclude the possibility of HPA axis suppression during prolonged exposure.

Effects on calcium metabolism

In patients treated with both calcipotriol/betamethasone dipropionate (Cal/BD) ointment on the body and Cal/BD topical suspension on the scalp (n=35), 1 patient (2.9%) had elevated urinary calcium levels after 4 weeks of treatment.

Three studies of Cal/BD topical suspension have evaluated treatment effects on calcium metabolism. In 2 of the 3 trials (n=32 and n=43), elevated urinary calcium levels outside the normal range were observed in 2 patients each. In the third trial (n=109), no clinically relevant changes in urinary calcium were reported.

Potential effects on calcium metabolism have been evaluated in three randomized, multicenter, prospective, vehicle- and/or active-controlled trials of the foam formulation enrolling 564 adults with plaque psoriasis. The foam was applied once daily for four weeks. In these trials, three subjects had serum calcium levels elevated above the upper limit of normal. Urinary calcium elevations above normal were reported in 17 subjects.

In a published multicenter, open-label, single-arm trial of the foam formulation, 35 adults with plaque psoriasis applied the foam once daily to all lesions on the trunk, limbs, and scalp for four weeks.  No elevations of serum calcium, urinary calcium, or the ratio of urinary calcium to creatinine above the upper limit of normal were observed.

History 

The combination was developed by LEO Pharma. To combine them, new non-aqueous non-alcohol formulations had to be found to avoid mutual degradation of the two active substances while also achieving the desired skin absorption.  The ointment formulation (Taclonex) was approved in 2006, by the US Food and Drug Administration (FDA) for the treatment of psoriasis vulgaris in adults 18 years and older. The topical suspension formulation (Taclonex) was approved in 2008, by the FDA for the treatment of plaque psoriasis of the scalp and body in adults 18 years and older. In 2014, the FDA also approved the topical suspension formulation for the treatment of plaque psoriasis of the scalp in adolescents aged 12 to 17 years. The foam formulation (Enstilar) was approved in October 2015, by the U.S. Food and Drug Administration. The ointment and topical suspension formulation (Daivobet) were also approved in 2010 by the European Medicines Agency for the treatment of plaque psoriasis where it is possible to use a topical medication (ointment), and for the treatment of scalp psoriasis or mild to moderate plaque psoriasis on the body (topical suspension).

References

Further reading

External links 
 

Combination drugs
Antipsoriatics